Nipuna Senaratne (born 19 October 1993) is an English cricketer. He made his first-class debut on 5 April 2013 for Cambridge MCCU against Essex.

References

External links
 

1993 births
Living people
Cambridge MCCU cricketers
Cambridge University cricketers
Cricketers from Leeds
English cricketers
British Asian cricketers
English people of Sri Lankan descent